Avdo Spahić (born 12 February 1997) is a professional footballer who plays as a goalkeeper for 1. FC Kaiserslautern. Born in Germany, he has represented Bosnia at youth level.

Club career
Born in Berlin, Spahić spent five years at Energie Cottbus before joining 1. FC Kaiserslautern in 2019.

References

External links
 

1997 births
Living people
Footballers from Berlin
German people of Bosnia and Herzegovina descent
Citizens of Bosnia and Herzegovina through descent
German footballers
Bosnia and Herzegovina footballers
Association football goalkeepers
Bosnia and Herzegovina youth international footballers
FC Energie Cottbus players
FC Energie Cottbus II players
1. FC Kaiserslautern players
3. Liga players
Regionalliga players
Oberliga (football) players